Frank Kozik (born January 9, 1962 in Madrid) is an American graphic artist best known for his posters for alternative rock bands.

History 
Kozik has worked with Nirvana, Pearl Jam, Soundgarden, Stone Temple Pilots, the Red Hot Chili Peppers, Melvins, The Offspring, Butthole Surfers, and Helmet. Kozik used to run Man's Ruin Records, a media outlet and record label, and has published several books including Man's Ruin: Posters and Art by Frank Kozik and Desperate Measures Empty Pleasures. Kozik has been described as "one of the rock world's top poster artists", and interviewed in Rolling Stone. Kozik created Smorkin' Labbit and is the Creative Director of Kidrobot. Although primarily known for his screen prints, a rare painting of the Labbit sold on the TV blind auction show Four Rooms for £4,000.

Kozik has been a force in the designer toy movement with many of his works produced in that form.

He is also a member of the Stuckism art movement.

See also

 Stuckism
 Lowbrow (art movement)

References

External links
 Official website for Frank Kozik

American artists
American poster artists
Stuckism
1962 births
Living people
Toy designers